Wiktor Długosz (born 1 July 2000) is a Polish professional footballer who plays as a right winger for Raków Częstochowa.

Career statistics

Honours
Raków Częstochowa
 Polish Cup: 2020–21, 2021–22
Polish Super Cup: 2022

References

External links

2000 births
Living people
Sportspeople from Kielce
Polish footballers
Poland youth international footballers
Poland under-21 international footballers
Association football midfielders
Korona Kielce players
Warta Poznań players
Raków Częstochowa players
Ekstraklasa players
I liga players
III liga players